Below is a list of railroads that were bought, leased, or in other ways had their track come under ownership or control by the Seaboard Air Line Railroad or one of its predecessors.

The Seaboard Air Line Railroad merged with the Atlantic Coast Line Railroad on July 1, 1967, to form the Seaboard Coast Line Railroad.

Predecessor lines

The Seaboard main line from Richmond to Tampa, heart of its 2600-mile system in 1900, (today mostly CSX's "S" Line), had been built by the following companies:

Richmond, Petersburg and Carolina Railroad, Richmond, Virginia to Norlina, North Carolina (the immediate predecessor of the SAL)
Raleigh and Gaston Railroad, Norlina to Raleigh, North Carolina
Raleigh and Augusta Air-Line Railroad, Raleigh to Hamlet, North Carolina
Palmetto Railroad, Hamlet to Cheraw, South Carolina
Chesterfield and Kershaw Railroad, Cheraw to Camden, South Carolina
Predecessors of the Florida Central and Peninsular Railroad:
South Bound Railroad, Camden to Savannah, Georgia
Florida Central and Peninsular Railroad Northern Division, Savannah to Georgia/Florida state line
Florida Northern Railroad, state line to Yulee, Florida
Fernandina and Jacksonville Railroad, Yulee to Jacksonville, Florida
Florida, Atlantic and Gulf Central Railroad, Jacksonville to Baldwin, Florida
Florida Railroad, Yulee to Baldwin to Waldo, Florida
Florida Transit and Peninsular Railroad Tampa Division, Waldo to Tampa, Florida

Acquired lines
In the first decades of the 20th century, Seaboard expanded its holdings by acquiring the following lines, some of which were created by the Seaboard to construct new lines it wished to have.

Acquired by purchase:
Florida Central and Peninsular Railroad, 1903
Tallahassee, Perry and Southeastern Railway, 1909
Atlanta and Birmingham Air Line Railway, 1909
Atlantic, Suwannee River and Gulf Railway, 1909
Florida West Shore Railway, 1909
Plant City, Arcadia and Gulf Railroad, 1909
Tampa Terminal Railroad, 1922
Jacksonville, Gainesville and Gulf Railroad, 1927

Acquired by lease:
Kissimmee River Railway, 1917
Brooksville and Inverness Railway, 1925
Tampa Northern Railroad, 1925
Charlotte Harbor and Gulf Coast Railway, 1925
Seaboard-All Florida Railway, 1925
Naples, Seaboard and Gulf Railway, 1925
Tampa and Gulf Coast Railroad, 1927
Georgia, Florida and Alabama Railroad, 1928
Northern Railway of Florida, 1928

Seaboard Air Line Railway

American Agricultural and Chemical Company

Athens Terminal Company

Atlanta and Birmingham Air Line Railway
Chattahoochee Terminal Railway
East and West Railroad
Birmingham and Atlanta Air Line Railway
East and West Railroad of Alabama
Cherokee Iron Company
Cherokee Iron and Railroad Company
Cherokee Railroad
Cartersville and Van Wert Railroad
Tredegar Mineral Railway

Atlantic, Suwannee River and Gulf Railway
Atlantic, Suwannee River and Gulf Railroad
Starke and Sampson City Railroad

Brooksville and Inverness Railway

Carolina, Atlantic and Western Railway
Charleston Southern Railway
Georgetown and Western Railroad
Georgetown and Lane's Railroad
Pee Dee Bridge Company
North and South Carolina Railway
Charleston Northern Railway
North and South Carolina Railway 
South Carolina Western Railway
South Carolina Western Extension Railway

Carolina Central Railroad
Carolina Central Railway
Wilmington, Charlotte and Rutherford Railroad
Wilmington and Charlotte Railroad

Catawba Valley Railway

Central Railway of Georgia (Lyons Branch only)

Charlotte Harbor and Northern Railway
Alafia, Manatee, and Gulf Coast Railroad

Charlotte, Monroe and Columbia Railroad

Chesterfield and Kershaw Railroad

Chesterfield and Lancaster Railroad

Columbus Railroad 
Brush Electric Light and Power Company

Durham and Northern Railway

Florida Central and Peninsular Railroad 
East Florida and Atlantic Railroad
Orlando and Winter Park Railway
Orlando and Lake Jesup Railway
Fernandina and Amelia Beach Railway
Florida Railway and Navigation Company
Fernandina and Jacksonville Railroad
Florida Central and Western Railroad
Florida Central Railroad
Florida, Atlantic and Gulf Central Railroad
Jacksonville, Pensacola and Mobile Railroad
Pensacola and Georgia Railroad
Tallahassee Railroad
Florida, Atlantic and Gulf Central Railroad (operated)
Florida, Peninsula and Jacksonville Railroad
Florida Transit and Peninsular Railroad
Florida Transit Railroad
Atlantic, Gulf and West India Transit Company
Florida Railroad 
Peninsular Railroad
Tropical Florida Railroad
Jacksonville and Mobile Railroad
Leesburg and Indian River Railroad
Florida Northern Railroad
Jacksonville Belt Railroad
Santa Fe Canal Company
Tavares, Orlando and Atlantic Railroad

Florida, Peninsular and Gulf Railroad
Arcadia, Gulf Coast and Lakeland Railroad

Florida West Shore Railway
United States & West Indies Railroad and Steamship Company

Gainesville Midland Railroad (bought by Seaboard in 1959)
Gainesville, Jefferson and Southern Railroad
Walton Railroad
Gainesville Midland Railway
Gainesville and North Western Railroad
Greene County Railroad
Bostwick Railroad

Georgia and Alabama Railway 
Abbeville and Waycross Railroad
Albany and Florida Railroad
Albany, Florida and Northern Railroad
Columbus and Southern Railroad
Columbus Southern Railway
Columbus and Florida Railway
Georgia and Alabama Terminal Company
Savannah, Americus and Montgomery Railway
Americus, Preston and Lumpkin Railroad
Montgomery & West Point Railroad

Georgia, Carolina and Northern Railway 
Chester, Greenwood and Abbeville Railroad

Georgia, Florida and Alabama Railroad (gained control in 1928)
Carrabelle, Tallahassee and Georgia Railroad
Georgia, Florida and Alabama Railway
Georgia Pine Railway

Kissimmee River Railway

Loganville and Lawrenceville Railroad

Macon, Dublin and Savannah Railroad

McRae Terminal Railway

Oxford and Coast Line Railroad

Line from Dickerson to Oxford, NC

Palmetto Railway
Palmetto Railroad

Plant City, Arcadia and Gulf Railway
Warnell Lumber and Veneer Company
Plant City and Arcadia Railroad

Raleigh and Augusta Air Line Railroad
Chatham Railroad
Pittsboro Railroad

Raleigh and Charleston Railroad 
Carolina Northern Railroad

Raleigh and Gaston Railroad 
Louisburg Railroad

Richmond, Petersburg and Carolina Railroad
Virginia and Carolina Railroad

Roanoke and Tar River Railroad

Seaboard Air Line Belt Railroad

Seaboard-All Florida Railway
East and West Coast Railway
Florida Western and Northern Railroad
Naples, Seaboard, and Gulf Railway

Seaboard and Roanoke Railroad 
Roanoke Railroad
Portsmouth and Roanoke Railroad

South Bound Railroad

Tallahassee, Perry and Southeastern Railway
Tallahassee Southeastern Railway
Florida, Georgia and Western Railway

Tampa Terminal Company

Tavares and Gulf Railroad (bought 1926)
Tavares, Apopka and Gulf Railroad

See also
List of Atlantic Coast Line Railroad precursors

External links
Seaboard System family tree (PDF)

 
Seaboard Air Line Railroad precursors
Seaboard Air Line